Fleet of Time, also known as Back in Time is a 2014 Chinese coming-of-age film directed by Zhang Yibai and starring  Eddie Peng, Ni Ni, Zheng Kai, Vision Wei and Zhang Zixuan. The film is adapted from the popular novel of the same name by Chinese writer Jiu Yehui (九夜茴).

Plot
A coming of age tale of a group of close friends as they experience high school, college and eventually adulthood through the '90s and 2000s. They meet again at a friend's wedding in 2014, and recalls their romantic past through memories.

Cast
Eddie Peng as Chen Xun
Ni Ni as Fang Hui
Zheng Kai as Zhao Ye
Vision Wei as Qiao Ran
Zhang Zixuan
Chen He as Su Kai
Yanting Ma
Cya Liu
Bi Xia as Shen Xiaotang

Theme song
"Cong Cong Na Nian" (匆匆那年)
Lyrics: Lin Xi 
Music: Kubert Leung
Singer: Faye Wong

References

External links

2010s romance films
Chinese coming-of-age films
Chinese romance films
Films based on Chinese novels
Films directed by Zhang Yibai
Chinese teen films